Ifeanyi Chudy Momah  is a Nigerian lawyer and businessman currently serving in the House of Representatives and represents Ihiala Federal Constituency, Anambra State. He is the Chairman of the House Committee on Federal Capital Territory Judiciary and a member of the Peoples Democratic Party.

Early life 
Born in General Hospital Okija to the family of Chief Mike Momah. Ifeanyi has stated that among his siblings he was the only one to be born there. According to him, his Father Chief Mike Momah was away on a trip out of the country when his mother decided to visit Ihiala, his home town when she unexpectedly went into labor and eventually had him there.

Ifeanyi had his early life in Festac Town, Lagos State, Attending Radius Nursery and Primary School, then he went on to Loral International School still in Festac before finally completing his Secondary education at Chrisland College in one of the more expensive secondary schools in Nigeria.

Study 

Ifeanyi Studied Law in the University of Lagos, upon graduating he was deployed to serve in the compulsory National Youth Service Corps where he was posted to Katsina, a state in the Northern parts of Nigeria and spent the service year in Malumfashi a small town very close to Daura.

After the service year he proceeded to University of Aberdeen , Scotland, where he did a legal proficiency course in International Jurisprudence law.

He subsequently returned to Nigeria and attended the Nigerian Law School in Bwari, Abuja where he was called to the bar.

Professional experience 
He practiced law with Rickey Tarfa & Co Chambers for a space of three years and later, he proceeded to  Arthur Obi-Okafor (SAN) & Co Chambers at Asaba

In 2013, He was invited to work with a subsidy reinvestment program (Sure-P) as the Assistant Director of legal affairs and the personal legal assistant to the formal Executive Secretary of SURE-P Nze Akachukwu Nwankpo. Through this medium he was able to help people especially the youths of Ihiala LGA have access to the loan facilities provided by the then federal government and also employment opportunities presented by this program.

Politics 
He has since pursued a career in politics contesting for the state house of assembly elections in 2011 which he lost. He contested again in 2015 this time for the House of Representatives but lost again, a loss he blames on election rigging and violence.

He went on to serve the Governor Willie Obiano as a Senior Special Adviser on political matters before contesting again in the 2019 general elections where he won.

As an elected member of the Federal House of Representatives, His political party APGA has about 10 members out of the 360 members making them a minority but this hasn't stopped him from making his voice heard and being influential in the House, He showed full Support for the current speaker Femi Gbajabiamila during the elections for the seat of the speaker.

He has spoken on the need to curb the armed banditry in Zamfara, a northern state of Nigeria.

He is not in support of the controversial social media bill and has stated that the youth have to use social media responsibly adding that there are already existing laws and would only result in a repeat of regulations. He has also called for the investigation of $396.33 million spent on three refineries in four years as the refineries are still performing below six percent of their capacity/

References 

All Progressives Grand Alliance politicians
Members of the House of Representatives (Nigeria)
People from Anambra State
University of Lagos alumni
21st-century Nigerian lawyers
1983 births
Living people